Gilberto Noletti (born 9 May 1941 in Cusano Milanino) is a retired Italian professional footballer who played as a defender. He represented Italy at the 1960 Summer Olympics.

References

1941 births
Living people
Italian footballers
Serie A players
A.C. Milan players
S.S. Lazio players
Juventus F.C. players
Calcio Lecco 1912 players
F.C. Grosseto S.S.D. players
Footballers at the 1960 Summer Olympics
Olympic footballers of Italy
Association football defenders